Anjirak (also Romanized as Anjīrak; also known as Anjīrī) is a village in Hasanabad Rural District, in the Central District of Eslamabad-e Gharb County, Kermanshah Province, Iran. At the 2006 census, its population was 690, in 147 families.

References 

Populated places in Eslamabad-e Gharb County